Weinsheim is a municipality in the district of Bad Kreuznach in Rhineland-Palatinate, in western Germany.

Notable people 
 Schnuckenack Reinhardt, gypsy jazz musician
 Angelina Vogt, German Wine Queen 2019/2020

References

Bad Kreuznach (district)